Tudor Mândrușcă (born 4 February 1989) is a Romanian footballer who plays as a forward.

Dorinel Munteanu has placed Mândrușcă among the most promising young talents of his generation.

References

External links

1989 births
Living people
Sportspeople from Cluj-Napoca
Romanian footballers
Association football forwards
CFR Cluj players
CSM Unirea Alba Iulia players
CS Național Sebiș players
CSM Ceahlăul Piatra Neamț players
Liga I players